Robert Groves (born 1935), sometimes known as Bob, was a British artist, and a co-founder of the Ikon Gallery in Birmingham, England, whose name he coined, inspired by his interest in icons

He is an Associate of the Royal Birmingham Society of Artists.

His 2007 exhibition and book, First Light, were inspired by the gardens at Packwood House.

His painting Abstract in Blue (1968) is in the permanent collection of the University of Birmingham.

Recalling the creation of the Ikon Gallery, Groves said:

Publications

References

Further reading 

 

1935 births
20th-century British painters
21st-century British painters
Members and Associates of the Royal Birmingham Society of Artists
Living people